Estrella Cabeza Candela (born 20 February 1987) is a former Spanish tennis player.

In her career, Cabeza Candela won 13 singles and 16 doubles titles on the ITF Women's Circuit. On 13 May 2013, she reached her best singles ranking of world No. 95. On 2 April 2012, she peaked at No. 176 in the doubles rankings.

Personal life
Cabeza Candela was born in Los Palacios y Villafranca to Manuel Cabeza (tennis coach) and Estrella Candela, sister is Ana (training to be an aeronautic engineer). She began playing tennis at age four with father and sister, and started playing seriously aged seven. Her Tennis idol was Monica Seles, favorite surface clay court.

Career
Coached by Gonzalo Lopez and Martin Vilar, Cabeza Candela had a break out year in 2013. She broke into the top 100 for the first time at age 26, by reaching No. 95 on 13 May 2013. 

Later that summer, she played her first Grand Slam main-draw at Wimbledon, and lost in the first round to Caroline Wozniacki, 0–6, 2–6. In early July, Cabeza Candela reached her best result in a WTA Tour tournament by reaching the semifinals at Palermo, losing to Roberta Vinci, in three sets.

She announced her retirement from professional tennis ın 2020.

ITF Circuit finals

Singles: 29 (13 titles, 16 runner-ups)

Doubles: 30 (16 titles, 14 runner-ups)

References

External links
 
 

1987 births
Living people
Spanish female tennis players
Tennis players from Andalusia
People from Los Palacios y Villafranca
Sportspeople from the Province of Seville